The Junkers J 5 was a designation assigned to several fighter aircraft designs.

Variants 
In early 1917, Junkers developed at least two cantilever wing monoplane fighter aircraft designs based on the J4.

J 5I 
The first design, known as the J 5I, was to have a Siemens Sh2 or Oberursel UR.II engine behind the cockpit.

J 5II 
The second design was to have the engine in front of the pilot.

J 5III (J 6) 
A third design was also developed under the designation J 5III (later J 6) with a Mercedes D.IIIa and a parasol wing.

Links 
 Junkers J5 (Hugo Junkers Homepage)

References

Junkers aircraft
Cancelled aircraft projects